Zygopetalum pedicellatum, commonly known as the Mosen's zygopetalum, is a species of orchid native to southeastern Brazil.

References

External links 

pedicellatum
Endemic orchids of Brazil